, also known as  is a Buddhist temple located in Nagoya in central Japan.

It has a wooden pagoda which is one of Japan's oldest, dating to the 16th century.
Maeda Toshiie's family bodhisattva.

References

External links 

Buddhist temples in Nagoya
Tendai temples